Love Story is a documentary film about the music band Love.  It covers the band's journey from their creation to present day and details the band's albums. The film premiered at the 50th London Film Festival in October 2006. It features interviews from Arthur Lee shortly before he died as well as other band members Johnny Echols and Alban "Snoopy" Pfisterer.  It also has archive interview footage of Bryan Maclean. The film was released on DVD in June 2008.

External links
 

2006 films
Rockumentaries
2006 documentary films
British documentary films
2000s English-language films
2000s British films
English-language documentary films